K2-141b (also designated EPIC 246393474.01) is a massive rocky exoplanet orbiting extremely close to an orange main-sequence star K2-141. The planet was first discovered by the Kepler space telescope during its K2 “Second Light” mission and later observed by the HARPS-N spectrograph. It is classified as an  Ultra-short Period (USP) and is confirmed to be terrestrial in nature. Its high density implies a massive iron core taking up between 30% and 50% of the planet's total mass.

Characteristics

Mass and radius
Like the majority of known exoplanets, K2-141b was detected using the transit method, where a planet blocks a tiny fraction of its star's light as it passed between our line of the sight and its host. This method is only able to determine the radius of the planet, not its mass. However, K2-141b was also detected by the radial velocity method using the HARPS-N spectrograph. Therefore, its mass could also be determined along with its radius. The planet is classified as a Super-Earth, being significantly larger and more massive than Earth but not as large as the ice giants Uranus and Neptune. K2-141b has a radius of 1.51 , below the 1.6  threshold where most planets are expected to accumulate thick hydrogen and helium atmospheres, transforming them into mini-Neptunes. The planet's mass confirms that it is rocky. It has a mass of 5.08 , which gives K2-141b a high density of 8.2 g/cm3, about 1.48 times the density of Earth. This high density implies a composition with a large iron core taking up about 30% to 50% of the planet's total mass.

Orbit
K2-141b has one of the shortest known orbital periods of any confirmed exoplanet. With an orbital period of only 6.7 hours, it is the shortest-period planet known to date with a precisely determined mass. Only a few planets, including those around Kepler-70, have shorter orbital periods. At this proximity, K2-141b is most likely tidally locked with its host star, meaning that the same side of the planet always faces the star. It has a semi-major axis of 0.00716 +0.00055−0.00065 AU.  For a comparison, Mercury's perihelion is 0.307499 AU, more than 41 times farther away from the Sun.

Atmosphere and climate 
Despite its terrestrial nature, K2-141b is far from habitable. However, the actual temperature is probably much higher. About two-thirds of K2-141b faces perpetual daylight. The night side experiences frigid temperatures of below . The day side of the exoplanet, at an estimated , is hot enough to not only melt rocks but vaporize them as well.

K2-141b is believed to have both an atmosphere and oceans, which are magma and likely tens of kilometers deep. The makeup of the atmosphere is unknown but likely consists of vaporized metals which are common in solid form on Earth. The atmosphere is believed to have extreme wind speeds of over 1.75 kilometers per second. Temperatures are high enough that the magma in the oceans can vaporize into the atmosphere. The mineral vapor formed by evaporated rock is swept to the frigid night side by supersonic winds and rocks "rain" back down into a magma ocean. The resulting currents flow back to the hot day side of the exoplanet, where rock evaporates once more. If the planet's atmosphere has high levels of sodium, then solid sodium might slowly slide towards the planet's oceans, similarly to how glaciers move on Earth.

Host star
K2-141 is an K5 main-sequence star about 61 parsecs (202 light years) away, in the direction of the constellation Pisces. Based on the spectral type (K5/6 D) of the star, the star's colour is orange. It has a radius of 0.681 ±0.018  and a mass of 0.708 ±0.028 . It has a temperature of 4,599 ±79 K and is between 1.6 and 12.9 billion years old. For comparison, the Sun has a temperature of 5778 K and is 4.5 billion years old.

See also
COROT-7b
Kepler-10b
Kepler-78b
Lists of exoplanets
List of directly imaged exoplanets
List of largest exoplanets
List of nearest exoplanets
WASP-47e

References

Exoplanets discovered by K2
Exoplanets discovered in 2018
Super-Earths
Pisces (constellation)